Mühlbach am Hochkönig is a municipality in St. Johann im Pongau district, Salzburgerland, Austria.

Population 

Its population was 1,622 inhabitants in 2005.

Location 

Mühlbach am Hochkönig is found approximately 8 km to the west of Bischofshofen and some 45 minutes south of the city of Salzburg at the foot of the Hochkönig mountain.

Surroundings 

A former copper mining town it is now mainly known as a winter ski resort and summer hiking area. Another hotel, Arturhaus is outside the town, and The hotel Alpengasthof Birgkarhaus sits at 1400 m in the heart of the Hochkönig ski slopes.

Sports 

A number of ski schools also operate. There are many easy slopes around the Arthurhaus area which make Mühlbach a good place to go for beginners, as well as many km of intermediate slopes. Mühlbach is also part of the Hochkönig ski area.

Gallery

See also 

 Salzburg
 Salzburgerland

References

External links 
 
 
 Hochkönig visitor bureau

Cities and towns in St. Johann im Pongau District